Khtun-Kazmalyar is a rural locality (a selo) in Tagirkent-Kazmalyarsky Selsoviet, Magaramkentsky District, Republic of Dagestan, Russia. The population was 1,509 as of 2010. There are 5 streets.

Geography 
Khtun-Kazmalyar is located 181 km southeast of Makhachkala. Tagirkent-Kazmalyar and Bilbil-Kazmalyar are the nearest rural localities.

Nationalities 
Lezgins live there.

References 

Rural localities in Magaramkentsky District